The Aujon is a  long river in the Haute-Marne and Aube departments in northeastern France. Its source is at Perrogney-les-Fontaines. It flows generally northwest. It is a right tributary of the Aube into which it flows at Longchamp-sur-Aujon.

Departments and communes along its course
This list is ordered from source to mouth: 
Haute-Marne: Perrogney-les-Fontaines, Auberive, Rochetaillée, Vauxbons, Saint-Loup-sur-Aujon, Giey-sur-Aujon, Arc-en-Barrois, Cour-l'Évêque, Coupray, Châteauvillain, Pont-la-Ville, Orges, Cirfontaines-en-Azois, Aizanville, Maranville, Rennepont, 
Aube: Longchamp-sur-Aujon,

References

Rivers of France
Rivers of Aube
Rivers of Haute-Marne
Rivers of Grand Est